Aunrihar is a town in Ghazipur district of Varanasi division of Uttar Pradesh. Aunrihar is situated in lat. 25° 32' N and long. 83° 11' E on the main road leading from Varanasi to Kushinagar on NH 29, about 42 Km. west from Ghazipur city and about 3.2 km. from Saidpur. This place is archaeologically interesting. One of the oldest and the most important sites in the district is the belt having collection of mounds stretching from Saidpur to Aunrihar. The whole surface of the ground of Aunrihar is strewn with fragments, large carved stones & fine pieces of sculpture which are being utilized as common building stone. Every few yards traces of masonry wall appears

History behind Aunrihar :

The word Aunrihar taken from two hindi words (Auri+har) means defeating "hoonds" 

Hoonds were very terrible, brutal and inhuman tribe peoples or military came somewhere from north west of China and Mongolia. After the alexander great, they spread terror over russia, Europe to Macedonia to other region in asia.

Aunrihar, Gazipur name is symbolic as in  form of victory of the great Indian warrior SKAND GUPT over Hoonds when nobody were capable to stop and defeat hoonds not only in india But out of the country as well . When hoonds invade india via takshshila, Bihar to Uttar Pradesh. King Skand Gupt was son of legendary king Kumar gupt bravely killed those invaders and compelled them to leave Hindustan (India).

Skand gupta kingdom period was from BC 452-467 and during the period this great and legendary warrior defeated hoonds military. The evidences can still be seen in aunrihar, ghazipur in form of ancient stone writing, pillar of victory at bhitri, gazipur, Uttar Pradesh. 

combination ofhindi  two w( ion  + Aun) means defeating of "hoonds" or victory over hoonds. Hoonds were solidly defeated by the great indian warrior  "SKANDA GUPT" during the period of BC 452-467 when they entered Hindustan (India) from Takshashila, Bihar and had terror over there  Uttar Pradesh.

Transport
Aunrihar Junction (under Varanasi division of the North Eastern Railway Zone of Indian Railways) is a railway station on Allahabad-Mau-Gorakhpur Main Line and Aunrihar–Jaunpur line, linking Aunrihar with other major cities. Departures from ARJ/Aunrihar Junction

Aunrihar Station  connects Mau Junction, Bhatni Junction and Gorakhpur Junction on north east direction, Phephna Junction, Ballia of east direction, Sarnath and Varanasi Junction on south-west direction and Jaunpur junction on north-west direction.

References 

Cities and towns in Ghazipur district